Boizenburg-Land is an Amt in the Ludwigslust-Parchim district, in Mecklenburg-Vorpommern, Germany. The seat of the Amt is in Boizenburg, itself not part of the Amt.

The Amt Boizenburg-Land consists of the following municipalities:
Bengerstorf
Besitz
Brahlstorf
Dersenow
Gresse
Greven
Neu Gülze
Nostorf
Schwanheide
Teldau
Tessin bei Boizenburg

Ämter in Mecklenburg-Western Pomerania